Fanny Schiller Hernández (3 August 1901 – 26 September 1971) was a Mexican award-winning character actress and television star, who also acted in operettas and musicals, during the Golden Age of Mexican cinema. She won two Ariel Awards for best supporting actress, and was nominated for two additional films. She was a social activist, creating the Actor's Union and inspiring the creation of “Rosa Mexicano”. She was accomplished at dubbing and was the voice of many animated characters as well as the official voice of several other notable Mexican actresses.

Biography
Fanny Schiller Hernández was born on 3 August 1901 in Mexico City, Mexico. At the age of 20, she began performing in the comedy company of Rosita Arriaga touring around the country. She then worked as a dancer with José María Topete, Consuelo Vivanco, María Conesa, before joining the company of her future mother-in-law, Virginia Fábregas.

She made her starring film debut in the movie El Cristo de oro (The Christ of Gold) with Manuel R. Ojeda in 1926, but did not make another film for approximately ten years. Instead, she was touring the country performing in vaudeville and comedy shows. Most of her film work in the 1940s was completed in Mexico. During the 1950s she worked for several periods in Hollywood.

Schiller was primarily known for character acting, portraying eccentric elderly women. She received a Herald Award for her role in Los cuervos están de luto ("The Crows are in Mourning") (1965) and was nominated four times for an Ariel Award. She won the Ariel Award for Best Supporting Actress twice, in 1947 and 1951.

Schiller was well respected for her work at voice-overs and dubbing; Edmundo Santos, voice director of Disney's releases in Spanish, was so impressed with her that he hired her to dub the Fairy Godmother in Cinderella (1950). She also was the voice of Snapdragon (the purple flower) in Alice in Wonderland, Aunt Sara in Lady and the Tramp, and the fairy Flora in the 1959 version of Sleeping Beauty. In the 1960s she did dubbing work for Hanna-Barbera, and was the voice of Fred Flintstone's mother in the animated series.

In 1955 Schiller ran for a seat in the Chamber of Deputies. This was the first time that women had been eligible to run for office in Mexico and the first time that women in Mexico would be able to participate in a national election, having won the right to vote in 1952. She was defeated, but attended the PRI Civic Day of Mexican Women on April 6, 1955, to celebrate the gains in women's rights.

Shortly before her death, Schiller pushed the National Association of Actors (ANDA) to form nurseries for the children of actresses.  Several of her acting friends, including Socorro Avelar, Anita Blanch, Dolores del Río, Irma Dorantes, Gloria Marín, Carmen Montejo, Silvia Pinal, and Amparo Rivelles joined to form a group called 'Rosa Mexicano'. The idea was that by establishing a nursery, actresses could continue working, and by establishing a Montessori education system, their children would receive a strong educational foundation. After operating in temporary spaces, the first stones for the formal location were laid on 30 April 1972, shortly after her death.

Personal life
Schiller came from a family of actors, and her mother was an actress. She married actor Manuel Sánchez-Navarro (1892-1969), son of actress Virginia Fábregas (1871–1950). Their son was actor Manolo Fábregas (1921-1996) and two of Manolo's children are also actors—Mónica Sánchez-Navarro and Rafael Sánchez-Navarro. Schiller died on 26 September 1971 in Mexico City.

Awards and nominations
1947: Cantaclaro, Best Supporting Actress, won Ariel Award
1947: Las abandonadas, Best Actress co-performance, nominated for Ariel
1948: A media luz, Best Supporting Actress, nominated for Ariel
1951: La mujer que yo amé, Best Supporting Actress, won Ariel

Filmography

Television

Films

References

External links

 Schiller's Disney Voices

Mexican voice actresses
Mexican television actresses
20th-century Mexican actresses
1901 births
1971 deaths
Mexican people of German descent
Actresses from Mexico City
Mexican stage actresses
Mexican film actresses